HelpAge Canada (previously known as Help the Aged Canada) is a Canadian not-for-profit organization dedicated to improving the lives of older persons in Canada and around the world. 

The organization offers national and global programs in the areas of health, wellness, emergency response, international development, age-friendly transportation, and social inclusion in collaboration with community-based organizations. HelpAge Canada joined the HelpAge International Global Network as a founding member in 1983 .

HelpAge Canada is a registered charity, with the registration number 118 955 921 RR0001.

See also
Respecting Elders: Communities Against Abuse

References

External links
 HelpAge Canada
 HelpAge International
 Canadian International Development Agency 
 Human Resources and Skills Development Canada
 HelpAge Canada Financial Audit Report, 2009/10
 HelpAge Canada Annual Report, 2010

Programs 
 Adopt a Gran Program
 Overseas Programs
 Canadian Programs
 Youth Internship Program

Ageism
Development charities based in Canada
Charities for the elderly
Old age in Canada